Janko Kroner (born 1 June 1956) is a Slovak film, television and stage actor. Once a regular cast of the Slovak National Theater (SND) (1987–2009), Kroner began his acting career as part of the New Scene (1982–86). In the mid 1990s, alongside staging for his home theater, he gradually began appearing in a local VA-based ensemble called a.ha. In the most recent decade, he has been known as the frontman of the Malá scéna STU, a body supervised by Kroner through 2010-2011.

As a member of the Slovak acting "dynasty" that span three generations to date, Kroner himself has received numerous nominations in his native country, including two LitFond Awards for Performing Arts in Drama, as well two television-focused OTO Awards as TV Male Actor, respectively. Amongst others, he is the only son of Ján Kroner, or rather a nephew of Jozef Kroner.

Filmography

 Film
 1982: The Emotional Education of a Daša  (as Julo)
 1984: The Brave Blacksmith (based on a Němcová's fairytale; as Matěj)
 1984: Farewell, Sweet Slumbers 
 1986: The Edelstein Action (as Filo)
 1986: Hothouse Venus (as Peter Vrchovský)
 1986: Icing (as Igor Krška)
 1987: The Devil's Smile (black-and-white; based on The Tales of Hoffmann, as Lt. Jurko)
 1989: Sitting on a Branch, Enjoying Myself
 1989: Nebojsa (based on a Pavol Dobšinský's fairytale; title r. as Ondrej "Nebojsa")
 1991: Fly of the Asphalt Pigeon (voice r., as Dodo)
 1996: Jašek's Dream (based on a Chrobák's story)
 1997: Orbis Pictus
 1997: Blue Heaven (voice r., as Viktor)
 2000: Victims and Murderers (as Josef)
 2002: Cruel Joys
 2002: Quartétto (as Peter)
 2007: Half-life (as Viktor)
 2009: You Kiss like a God
 2009: BRATISLAVAfilm (as Milanko)

Awards

See also
 List of Slovak films
 List of people surnamed Kroner

Further reading

References

Sources

External links

 
 Janko Kroner at FDb.cz
 
 Janko Kroner at Kinobox.cz
 
 

Janko
1956 births
Living people
People from Považská Bystrica
Slovak male film actors
Slovak male television actors
Slovak male stage actors
20th-century Slovak male actors
21st-century Slovak male actors
People with bipolar disorder